Brigitte Rintisch is a retired East German rower who won two gold, two silver and one bronze medals at the European championships of 1961–1966. After marrying between 1964 and 1966 she competed as Brigitte Butze.

References

Year of birth missing (living people)
Living people
East German female rowers
European Rowing Championships medalists